The citrange (a portmanteau of citrus and orange) is a citrus hybrid of the sweet orange and the trifoliate orange.

The purpose of this cross was to attempt to create a cold hardy citrus tree (which is the nature of a trifoliate), with delicious fruit like those of the sweet orange. However, citranges are generally bitter.

Citrange is used as a rootstock for citrus in Morocco, but does not prevent dry root rot or exocortis disease.

Cultivars 
There are several named citrange cultivars, including the 'Carrizo' citrange and the 'Troyer' citrange. Both resulted from a hybrid between the trifoliate orange and the Washington navel orange. There is also a cultivar called 'Rusk' which resulted from a cross between a Ruby orange and a trifoliate orange.

See also 
Citrangequat
List of citrus diseases
University of California, Riverside Citrus Variety Collection

References

External links 
Citrange photos
 Lemon on Troyer Citrange Root; bud-union and rootstock disorder of Troyer citrange with Eureka lemon tops under study in effort to identify cause
 The Citrange Story
 Citrange fruit extracts alleviate obesity-associated metabolic disorder in high-fat diet-induced obese C57BL/6 mouse.
Population of Endogenous Pararetrovirus Genomes in Carrizo Citrange

Citrus
Citrus hybrids
Oranges (fruit)